Monna Vanna is a 1922 German silent historical film directed by Richard Eichberg and starring Lee Parry, Paul Wegener, and Hans Stürm.

The film is based on the play Monna Vanna by Maurice Maeterlinck which itself drew on story by the sixteenth century writer Niccolò Machiavelli. It was made at the Emelka Studios near Munich as part of a deal Eichberg had struck with Bavaria Film. Some filming also took place at the Johannisthal Studios in Berlin. The film's sets were designed by the art directors Willy Reiber, Jacek Rotmil and Kurt Richter.

Cast

See also
 Monna Vanna (1915)

References

Bibliography
 Bock, Hans-Michael & Bergfelder, Tim. The Concise CineGraph. Encyclopedia of German Cinema. Berghahn Books, 2009.

External links

1922 films
1920s historical films
German historical films
Films of the Weimar Republic
Films directed by Richard Eichberg
Films based on works by Maurice Maeterlinck
German silent feature films
Films set in the 15th century
Films set in Italy
Cultural depictions of Niccolò Machiavelli
Remakes of Italian films
German black-and-white films
Films shot at Bavaria Studios
Films shot at Johannisthal Studios
Bavaria Film films
Fox Film films
Adaptations of works by Niccolò Machiavelli
1920s American films
1920s German films